Vivienne Baber (born 1911, sometimes credited as Vivian or Vivianne) was an actress in the United States. She had a starring role in the 1932 film The Black King.

Early life

Baber was born in 1911 in Brooklyn, New York, to parents Henry and Ethel. For the 1925 New York state census, her family's race is listed as Creole. Her father was a bank clerk and she had a younger sister named Muriel. By 1930 she had changed the spelling of her name to "Vivian". She began acting on stage productions in 1929, at age 18; her first role was the main character in the play, Harlem. Before that, she had sung in a cabaret chorus. In a 1932 interview, Baber said she had "Indian and English blood in [her] veins", and described herself as "three-quarters white and one-quarter colored". She also said she had danced at the Brooklyn Academy of Music, and still lived in the borough.

Career
Baber played the starring role in a 1929 production of Make Me Know It at Wallack's Theatre in New York City, following a three-day preview in New Rochelle. She played a part in You Know Me that same year at Wallack's Theatre. A reviewer praised Baber's performance as "surpass[ing] the rest of the cast" in 1930's Sweet Chariot, and another said she was good at her part and the play entertaining, though it was short of being "important". She was among the supporting cast of Confidence with Frank H. Wilson later that year. Baber was a principal actor in a 1932–33 production of the musical comedy Shuffle Along by Flournoy Miller.

After disliking the roles she was typecast in, she quit acting for seven years. During this time, she worked for the Afro-American Newspapers and organized a children's theater organization in Washington, D.C. She returned to acting around 1946 to play the character Wini Bennett in the play, On Whitman Avenue in New York City.

She was the only woman cast in one show.

Theater
Harlem (1929) as Cordelia Williams
Make Me Know It (1929) as Mona Bannon
Ginger Snaps (1929) 
Sweet Chariot (1930) as Delia
Confidence (1930)
Savage Rhythm (1932) as Star
Shuffle Along of 1933 as Alice Walker; a revival of Shuffle Along
On Whitman Avenue (1946) as Wini Bennett

Filmography
They Know Their Groceries (1929) Vitaphone short
The Black King (1932) as Mary Lou Lawton

Personal life
Baber married Peter Douglas Johnson (1906–1958) in Brooklyn on February 28, 1937. They divorced before May 1946.

References

Notes

External links
Newspaper image of Baber from The Pittsburgh Courier in October 1930

Year of birth missing (living people)
1910s births
20th-century African-American women
20th-century African-American people
20th-century American actresses
People from Brooklyn